Wilhelm, German Crown Prince, Crown Prince of Prussia (Friedrich Wilhelm Victor August Ernst; 6 May 1882 – 20 July 1951) was the eldest child of the last Kaiser, the German Emperor, Wilhelm II, and his consort Augusta Victoria of Schleswig-Holstein. As Emperor Wilhelm's heir, he was the last Crown Prince of the German Empire and the Kingdom of Prussia.

Wilhelm became crown prince at the age of six in 1888, when his grandfather Frederick III died and his father became emperor. He was crown prince for 30 years until the fall of the empire on 9 November 1918. During World War I, he commanded the 5th Army from 1914 to 1916 and was commander of the Army Group German Crown Prince for the remainder of the war. After his return to Germany in 1923, he fought the Weimar Republic and campaigned for the reintroduction of the monarchy in Germany. After his plans to become president had been blocked by his father, Wilhelm supported Adolf Hitler's rise to power, but when Wilhelm realised that Hitler had no intention of restoring the monarchy, their relationship cooled. Wilhelm became head of the House of Hohenzollern on 4 June 1941 following the death of his father and held the position until his own death on 20 July 1951.

Early life

Wilhelm was born on 6 May 1882 as the eldest son of the then Prince Wilhelm of Prussia, and his first wife, Princess Augusta Victoria of Schleswig-Holstein. He was born in the Marmorpalais of Potsdam in the Province of Brandenburg, where his parents resided until his father acceded to the throne. When he was born, his great-grandfather Wilhelm I was the German Emperor and his grandfather Crown Prince Frederick William was the heir apparent, making Wilhelm third in line to the throne.

His birth sparked an argument between his parents and his grandmother Crown Princess Victoria. Before Wilhelm was born, his grandmother had expected to be asked to help find a nurse, but since her son did everything he could to snub her, the future Wilhelm II asked his aunt Princess Helena to help instead. His mother was hurt and his grandmother, Queen Victoria, who was the younger Wilhelm's great-grandmother, was furious.

Prince Wilhelm would have five younger brothers: Prince Eitel Friedrich, Prince Adalbert, Prince August Wilhelm, Prince Oskar and Prince Joachim and one younger sister: Princess Viktoria Luise. He spent his childhood with his siblings at Marmorpalais and after his father's accession to the throne at the New Palace, also in Potsdam.

In the Year of the Three Emperors, when his great-grandfather and grandfather both died in 1888, his father became German Emperor, and six-year-old Wilhelm became the heir apparent to the German and Prussian thrones with the title of Kronprinz. He spent his school days with his brothers at the Prinzenhaus in Plön in his mother’s ancestral Schleswig-Holstein.

Wilhelm was a supporter of association football, then a relatively new sport in the country, donating a cup to the German Football Association in 1908 and thereby initiating the Kronprinzenpokal (now Länderpokal), the oldest cup competition in German football. The German club BFC Preussen was also originally named BFC Friedrich Wilhelm in his honour.

In 1914, the Kaiser ordered the construction of Schloss Cecilienhof in Potsdam for Prince Wilhelm and his family which angered him. The Schloss was loosely inspired by Bidston Court in Birkenhead, England, resembling a Tudor manor. Completed in 1917, it became the main residence for the Crown Prince for a time.

World War I
Wilhelm had been active in pushing German expansion, and sought a leading role on the outbreak of war. Despite being only thirty-two and having never commanded a unit larger than a regiment, the German Crown Prince was named commander of the 5th Army in August 1914, shortly after the outbreak of World War I. However, under the well-established Prussian/German General Staff model then in use, inexperienced nobles who were afforded commands of large army formations were always provided with (and expected to defer to the advice of) experienced chiefs of staff to assist them in their duties. As Emperor, Wilhelm's father instructed the Crown Prince to defer to the advice of his experienced chief of staff Konstantin Schmidt von Knobelsdorf.

In October 1914 Wilhelm gave his first interview to a foreign correspondent and the first statement to the press made by a German noble since the outbreak of war. He denied promoting military solutions to diplomatic problems, and said this in English:

From August 1915 onwards, Wilhelm was given the additional role as commander of the Army Group German Crown Prince. In 1916 his troops began the Verdun Offensive, a year-long effort to destroy the French armies that would end in failure. Wilhelm relinquished command of the 5th Army in November of that year, but remained commander of the Army Group German Crown Prince for the rest of the war.

1918–34
After the outbreak of the German Revolution in 1918, both Emperor Wilhelm II and the Crown Prince signed the document of abdication. On 13 November, the former Crown Prince fled Germany, crossed into the Netherlands at Oudvroenhoven and was later interned on the island of Wieringen (now part of the mainland), near Den Helder. In the autumn of 1921, Gustav Stresemann visited Wilhelm, and the former Crown Prince voiced an interest in returning to Germany, even as a private citizen. After Stresemann became chancellor in August 1923, Wilhelm was allowed to return after giving assurances that he would not engage in politics. He chose 9 November 1923 for this, which infuriated his father, who had not been informed about the plans of his son and who felt the historic date to be inappropriate.

In June 1926, a referendum on expropriating the former ruling Princes of Germany without compensation failed and as a consequence, the financial situation of the Hohenzollern family improved considerably. A settlement between the state and the family made Cecilienhof property of the state but granted a right of residence to Wilhelm and his wife Cecilie. This was limited in duration to three generations. The family also kept the ownership of Monbijou Palace in Berlin, Oels Castle in Silesia, and Rheinsberg Palace until 1945.

Wilhelm broke the promise he had made to Stresemann to stay out of politics. Adolf Hitler visited Wilhelm at Cecilienhof three times, in 1926, in 1933 (on the "Day of Potsdam") and in 1935. Wilhelm joined Der Stahlhelm, which merged in 1931 into the Harzburg Front, a right-wing organisation of those opposed to the democratic republic.

The former Crown Prince was reportedly interested in the idea of running for Reichspräsident as the right-wing candidate against Paul von Hindenburg in 1932, until his father (who privately supported Hindenburg) forbade him from acting on the idea. After his plans to become president had been blocked by his father, Wilhelm supported Hitler's rise to power.

1934–51

After the murder of his friend Kurt von Schleicher, the former Chancellor, in the Night of the Long Knives (1934), he withdrew from all political activities.

When Wilhelm realised that Hitler had no intention of restoring the monarchy, their relationship cooled. Upon his father's death in 1941, Wilhelm succeeded him as head of the House of Hohenzollern, the former German imperial dynasty. He was approached by those in the military and the diplomatic service who wanted to replace Hitler, but Wilhelm turned them down. After the ill-fated assassination attempt on 20 July 1944, Hitler nevertheless had Wilhelm placed under supervision by the Gestapo and had his home at Cecilienhof watched.

In January 1945, Wilhelm left Potsdam for Oberstdorf for a treatment of his gall and liver problems. His wife Cecilie fled in early February 1945 as the Red Army drew closer to Berlin, but they had been living apart for a long time. At the end of the war, Wilhelm's home, Cecilienhof, was seized by the Soviets. The palace was subsequently used by the Allied Powers as the venue for the Potsdam Conference.

At the end of the war, Wilhelm was captured by French Moroccan troops in Baad, Austria and was interned as a (World War I) war criminal. Transferred to Hechingen, Germany, he lived for a short time in Hohenzollern Castle under house arrest before moving to a small five-room house at Fürstenstraße 16 in Hechingen where he died on 20 July 1951, of a heart attack. Three days later, his opponent in the Battle of Verdun, Marshal Philippe Pétain, died in prison in France.

Wilhelm and his wife are buried at Hohenzollern Castle.

Family and children

Wilhelm married Duchess Cecilie of Mecklenburg-Schwerin (20 September 1886 – 6 May 1954) in Berlin on 6 June 1905. After their marriage, the couple lived at the Crown Prince's Palace in Berlin in the winter and at the Marmorpalais in Potsdam, later on at Cecilienhof in Potsdam. Cecilie was the daughter of Frederick Francis III, Grand Duke of Mecklenburg-Schwerin (1851–1897) and his wife, Grand Duchess Anastasia Mikhailovna of Russia (1860–1922). Their eldest son, Prince Wilhelm of Prussia, was killed fighting for the German Army in France in 1940.

Their children are:
Prince Wilhelm of Prussia (1906–1940), who renounced his succession rights in 1933 in order to marry Dorothea von Salviati, and had issue
Louis Ferdinand, Prince of Prussia (1907–1994); married 1938 Grand Duchess Kira Kirillovna of Russia and had issue
Prince Hubertus of Prussia (1909–1950); married 1941 Baroness Maria von Humboldt-Dachroeden, 1943 Princess Magdalena Reuss and had issue
Prince Frederick of Prussia (1911–1966); married 1945 Lady Brigid Guinness and had issue:
Princess Alexandrine of Prussia (1915–1980), called "Adini"
Princess Cecilie Viktoria Anastasia Zita Thyra Adelheid of Prussia (1917–1975); married Clyde Kenneth Harris on 21 June 1949, and had issue

Honours
German honours

Foreign honours

Coat of arms

Ancestry

Notes

References

Citations

Literature

External links

The memoirs of the Crown Prince of Germany 
The Life of Crown Prince Wilhelm
Interview in Fox Movietone News 1932

 
 A review of his memoir from The New Republic (1922)
 His difficulty with his father: Current Literature Magazine, 1912
 The exiled Crown Prince in Holland: The Literary Digest, 1919

1882 births
1951 deaths
Crown Princes of Prussia
Generals of Infantry (Prussia)
German Army generals of World War I
German monarchists
Grand Crosses of the Military Order of Max Joseph
Heirs apparent who never acceded
House of Hohenzollern
Knights of the Golden Fleece of Spain
National Socialist Motor Corps members
Military personnel from Potsdam
People from the Province of Brandenburg
Pretenders to the German throne
Prussian princes
Recipients of the Military Merit Cross (Mecklenburg-Schwerin), 1st class
Recipients of the Pour le Mérite (military class)
Grand Crosses of the Order of Saint Stephen of Hungary
2
2
Extra Knights Companion of the Garter
Recipients of the Order of the Netherlands Lion
Grand Crosses of the Order of Saint-Charles
Sons of emperors
Children of Wilhelm II, German Emperor
Sons of kings